Magnum Cum Louder is the fourth studio album by Australian rock group Hoodoo Gurus. The album was produced by the group, and released in Australia in May 1989 and peaked at number 13.

Faulkner later said, "We produced the record ourselves for our own morale, if nothing else. We had been through a very rough period with six months of inactivity from a lawsuit to get free of our old contract. Rather than even telling the record company what we were recording we let them hear it after it was all finished, and luckily they liked it! We would have been in deep trouble otherwise."

The album was re-released by EMI on 7 February 2005 with three bonus tracks, "Spaghetti Western", "Lover for a Friend", and "Cajun Country", a fold out poster and liner notes by Steve MacDonald (Redd Kross).

The lead track "Come Anytime" was the theme song of Australian television series Thank God You're Here in 2006 and the American series in 2007.

Track listing

Personnel
 Dave Faulkner – Lead vocals, guitar, keyboards
 Richard Grossman – Bass guitar, backing vocals
 Mark Kingsmill – Drums, backing vocals (grunts)
 Brad Shepherd – Guitar, harmonica, backing vocals
 Stephanie Faulkner – Backing vocals (track 11)
 Engineer – Alan Thorne
 Mixer – David Thoener
 Producer – Hoodoo Gurus

Charts

Weekly charts

Year end charts

Certifications

References

Hoodoo Gurus albums
1989 albums